"Day-O (The Banana Boat Song)" is a traditional Jamaican folk song. The song has mento influences, but it is commonly classified as an example of the better known calypso music.

It is a call and response work song, from the point of view of dock workers working the night shift loading bananas onto ships. The lyrics describe how daylight has come, their shift is over, and they want their work to be counted up so that they can go home.

The best-known version was released by Jamaican-American singer Harry Belafonte in 1956 (originally titled "Banana Boat (Day-O)") and later became one of his signature songs. That same year the Tarriers released an alternative version that incorporated the chorus of another Jamaican call and response folk song, "Hill and Gully Rider". Both versions became simultaneously popular the following year, placing 5th and 6th on the 20 February, 1957, US Top 40 Singles chart. The Tarriers version was covered multiple times in 1956 and 1957, including by the Fontane Sisters, Sarah Vaughan, Steve Lawrence, and Shirley Bassey, all of whom charted in the top 40 in their respective countries.

History
"The Banana Boat Song" likely originated around the beginning of the 20th century when the banana trade in Jamaica was growing. It was sung by Jamaican dockworkers, who typically worked at night to avoid the heat of the daytime sun. When daylight arrived, they knew that their boss would arrive to tally the bananas so they could go home.

The song was first recorded by Trinidadian singer Edric Connor and his band Edric Connor and the Caribbeans on the 1952 album Songs From Jamaica; the song was called "Day Dah Light". Belafonte based his version on Connor's 1952 and Louise Bennett's 1954 recordings.

In 1955, American singer-songwriters Lord Burgess and William Attaway wrote a version of the lyrics for The Colgate Comedy Hour, in which the song was performed by Harry Belafonte. Belafonte recorded the song for RCA Victor and this is the version that is best known to listeners today, as it reached number five on the Billboard charts in 1957 and later became Belafonte's signature song. Side two of Belafonte's 1956 Calypso album opens with "Star O", a song referring to the day shift ending when the first star is seen in the sky. During recording, when asked for its title, Harry spells, "Day Done Light".

Also in 1956, folk singer Bob Gibson, who had traveled to Jamaica and heard the song, taught his version to the folk band the Tarriers. They recorded a version of that song that incorporated the chorus of "Hill and Gully Rider", another Jamaican folk song. This release became their biggest hit, reaching number four on the pop charts, where it outperformed Belafonte's version. The Tarriers' version was recorded by the Fontane Sisters, Sarah Vaughan, and Steve Lawrence in 1956, all of whom charted in the US Top 40, and by Shirley Bassey in 1957, whose recording became a hit in the United Kingdom. The Tarriers, or some subset of the three members of the group (Erik Darling, Bob Carey and Alan Arkin, later better known as an actor) are sometimes credited as the writers of the song.

Notable covers 
 In 1980, Canadian children's singer Raffi covered the song, releasing on his album Baby Beluga.
 The Fontane Sisters recorded the Tarriers version in a recording of the song for Dot Records in 1956. It charted to number 13 in the US in 1957.
 Sarah Vaughan and an orchestra conducted by David Carroll recorded a jazzy version for Mercury Records in 1956, credited to Darling, Carey, and Arkin of the Tarriers. It charted at number 19 on the US Top 40 charts in 1957.
 Shirley Bassey recorded the Tarriers version in 1957 for 4 Star Records, which became her first single to chart in the U.K., peaking at number 8. It later appeared on her 1959 album The Bewitching Miss Bassey.
 Steve Lawrence recorded the Tarriers version in 1957 for Coral Records, with a chorus and orchestra directed by Dick Jacobs. It peaked at number 18 on the US Top 40 charts that year.

Parodies and alternate lyrics
 "Banana Boat (Day-O)", a parody by Stan Freberg and Billy May released in 1957 by Capitol Records, features ongoing disagreement between an enthusiastic Jamaican lead singer (played by Freberg) and a bongo-playing beatnik (played by Peter Leeds) who "don't dig loud noises" and has the catchphrase "You're too loud, man". When he hears the lyric about the "deadly black taranch-la" (actually the highly venomous Brazilian wandering spider, commonly dubbed "banana spider"), the beatnik protests, "No, man! Don't sing about spiders, I mean, oooo! like I don't dig spiders". Freberg's version was popular, reaching number 25 on the US Top 40 charts in 1957, and received much radio airplay; Harry Belafonte reportedly disliked the parody. Stan Freberg's version was the basis for the jingle for the TV advert for the UK chocolate bar Trio from the mid-1980s to the early to mid-1990s, the lyrics being, "Trio, Trio, I want a Trio and I want one now. Not one, not two, but three things in it; chocolatey biscuit and a toffee taste too."
 Dutch comedian André van Duin released his version in 1972 called Het bananenlied: the banana song. This song asks repetitively why bananas are bent. It reaches the conclusion that if the bananas weren't bent they wouldn't fit into their peels.
 German band Trio performed a parody with "Bommerlunder" (a German schnapps) substituted for the words "daylight come" in the 1980s.
 The Serbian comedy rock band the Kuguars, consisting of famous Serbian actors, covered the song in 1998, with lyrics in Serbian dedicated to the, at the time, Yugoslav national soccer team player Dejan "Dejo" Savićević. The song became a nationwide hit, and a promotional video for the song had been recorded.
 In their 1994 album, the comedy music group Grup Vitamin included a Turkish cover of the song parodying the macho culture in the country.
 In 1988–89, Belafonte's children, David and Gina, parodied the song in a commercial about the Oldsmobile Toronado Trofeo. (David was singing "Trofeo" in the same style as "Day-O" in the song). 
 A 1991 brazillian commercial utilized a parody of the song to promote their bubble gum brand "Bubbaloo Banana" with lyrics dedicated to the banana-flavoured candy
 A parody of this song was used in an E-Trade commercial that first aired on Super Bowl LII
 Food manufacturer Kellogg's parodied the song in their 2001 television advertisement for their breakfast cereal Fruit 'n Fibre.
 For an ad campaign that started in 1991, now-defunct Seattle-based department store chain The Bon Marché used a version of the song with alternate lyrics in their commercials.
 The Swedish humor show Rally, which aired between 1995 and 2002 in Sveriges Radio P3 made a version called "Hey Mr. Taliban", which speaks about Osama Bin Laden.
 The Rockin Roll Morning show on KOMP 92.3 created a flash video called Osama bin Laden Nowhere to run - nowhere to hide that features United States Secretary of Defense Colin Powell singing a parody of the song about Osama bin Laden getting bombed.
 In November 2019, The Late Show with Stephen Colbert modified the lyrics to make fun of Mike Pompeo, saying "Pompe-O, Pompe-O. Hearing come and I wanna go home."

Samples and interpolations
 Chilean program 31 minutos used the song "Arwrarwrirwrarwro" by Bombi which was based on "Day-O (The Banana Boat Song)".
 Jason Derulo's song "Don't Wanna Go Home" heavily samples "Day-O (The Banana Boat Song)".
Lil Wayne's song "6 Foot 7 Foot" samples and derives its title from "Day-O (The Banana Boat Song)".

In media and politics
 The original 1956 Belafonte recording is heard in the 1988 film Beetlejuice in a dinner scene in which the guests are supernaturally compelled to dance along to the song by the film's protagonists. It was sung by Beetlejuice and Lydia in the first episode of the television animated series, and it appeared in the Broadway musical adaptation.
 In the TV series The Muppet Show  season 3 episode 14, Harry Belafonte performs the song accompanied by Fozzie Bear and other muppets. Fozzie Bear requests to be a tally man as identified in the lyrics of the song. Harry Belafonte explains what a tally man is as he proceeds to sing with other muppets accompanying singing the songs answer.
 In the TV series Legends of Tomorrow season 2 episode 14 "Moonshot", the character Martin Stein abruptly starts singing the song to cause a distraction.
 During the first leg of the thirty-second season of the American version of The Amazing Race, contestants had to play a section of the song on a steelpan during a Roadblock challenge.
 In the Justin Trudeau blackface controversy, on September 18, 2019, Justin Trudeau, the Prime Minister of Canada, admitted to singing "Day-O" while wearing blackface makeup and an afro wig at a talent show when he was in high school at Collège Jean-de-Brébeuf.

References

External links
 English version of the text can be found at the bottom of the page. These lyrics are different from Belafonte's original version
 Mark Roth, "The Banana Boat Song: 'Daylight come and me wan' go home ...'", Pittsburgh Post-Gazette, 27 November 2005
Daylight Come and I Wanna Go Home Lyrics at Pro Lyrical

Jamaican songs
Number-one singles in Germany
1956 singles
1957 singles
Harry Belafonte songs
The Fontane Sisters songs
Shirley Bassey songs
Calypso songs
Bananas in popular culture
Songs about labor
RCA Records singles
Year of song unknown
Songwriter unknown